Caroline Keer,  (1857 – 29 December 1928) was a British military nurse and nursing administrator, who served in Natal during the Second Boer War.

Nursing career
Keer served with the British Army's Nursing Service from December 1887, where she nursed at the Royal Victoria Military Hospital, Netley, before she was posted to Egypt from 1888 to 1894. She served in Natal during the Second Boer War in 1899 for which she received the Royal Red Cross and the Queen's and King's South African medals. In 1903 she was appointed Principal Matron at Pretoria, South Africa. At the time of her appointment there were 14 military hospitals serving soldiers and their families; a central duty of her position was to supervise and inspect each hospital.

Upon her appointment as matron-in-chief, the British Journal of Nursing reported:

Keer served as matron-in-chief of Queen Alexandra's Royal Army Nursing Corps from 5 April 1906 to 5 April 1910, retiring two months later.

Laterlife and family
Caroline Keer died on 29 December 1928, aged 71, at her home in West Worthing, Sussex from undisclosed causes. She never married.

Honoria Somerville Keer was a half-sister by their father, Major General Jonathan Keer (1825–1907), ex-HM Bengal Staff Corps.

References

External links
RCN archive
Biodata at QARANC website

1857 births
1928 deaths
British Army personnel of the Second Boer War
British nursing administrators
Members of the Royal Red Cross
People from Worthing
Queen Alexandra's Royal Army Nursing Corps officers